Jovinus is a Roman cognomen, most often used for a 5th-century Roman usurper emperor.  This article is about the Roman usurper. For the saint, see Saint Jovinus. For the Frankish duke, see Jovinus of Provence. For the 4th century Roman general and consul of Gaul whose sarcophage is in Reims see Jovinus (consul).

Jovinus was a Gallo-Roman senator and claimed to be Roman Emperor (411–413 AD).

Following the defeat of the usurper known as Constantine III, Jovinus was proclaimed emperor at Mainz in 411, a puppet supported by Gundahar, king of the Burgundians, and Goar, king of the Alans. Jovinus kept his position in Gaul for two years, long enough to issue coinage that showed him wearing the imperial diadem. He was supported by a number of local Gallo-Roman nobles who had survived Constantine's defeat.

Under the pretext of Jovinus' imperial authority, Gundahar and his Burgundians established themselves on the left bank of the Rhine (the Roman side) between the river Lauter and the Nahe. Here they founded a kingdom with the old Romanized Gaulish settlement of Borbetomagus (Worms) as its capital.

Jovinus' end came after the Visigoths under Ataulf left Italy (at Priscus Attalus' advice), ostensibly to join him, carrying with them as hostages the ex-emperor Attalus and Galla Placidia, Honorius' half-sister. Then Ataulf attacked and killed Sarus, who had also come to support Jovinus. Jovinus, offended at this act, then failed to consult Ataulf when he elevated his brother Sebastianus as co-emperor. Insulted, Ataulf allied his Visigoths with Honorius, and they defeated Jovinus' troops. Sebastianus was executed. Jovinus fled for his life, but was besieged and captured in Valentia (Valence, Drôme) and taken to Narbo (Narbonne), where Caius Posthumus Dardanus, the praetorian prefect (governor) in Gaul, who had remained loyal to Honorius, had him executed. Jovinus' and Sebastianus' heads were afterwards sent to Honorius and mounted on the walls of Ravenna (before being passed on to Carthage, where they were put on permanent display with the heads of four other usurpers).

References
 Ralf Scharf: Iovinus – Kaiser in Gallien, in: Francia 20 (1993), pp. 1–13.
 Drinkwater, J. F., "The Usurpers Constantine III (407-411) and Jovinus (411-413)", Britannia, 29 (1998), p. 269-298

External links

5th-century Roman emperors
413 deaths
5th-century Roman usurpers
5th-century murdered monarchs
Year of birth unknown
Executed Roman emperors
People executed by the Roman Empire
Senators of the Roman Empire